Tamma Srinivasa Reddy (born 1968) is an Indian photographer. He won first prize in national level photography contest organised by Vigyan Prasar, Department of Science and Technology (India), Pinnamaneni puraskaram and Hamsa Award conferred by Andhra Pradesh State Government in 2013.

References

External links
 Tamma Srinivasa Reddy's personal website

Living people
Recipients of the Kala Ratna
1968 births